Trisquel (full name Trisquel GNU/Linux) is a computer operating system, a Linux distribution, derived from another distribution, Ubuntu. The project aims for a fully free software system without proprietary software or firmware and uses a version of Ubuntu's modified kernel, with the non-free code (binary blobs) removed. Trisquel relies on user donations. Its logo is a triskelion, a Celtic symbol. Trisquel is listed by the Free Software Foundation as a distribution that contains only free software.

Overview 
Four basic versions are available.

Trisquel 
The standard Trisquel distribution includes the MATE desktop environment and graphical user interface (GUI), and English, Spanish and 48 other localizations, 50 in total, on a 2.6 GB live DVD image. Other translations can be downloaded if an internet connection is present during installation.

Trisquel Mini 
Trisquel Mini is an alternative to mainline Trisquel, designed to run well on netbooks and older hardware. It uses the low-resource environment LXDE and lightweight GTK+ and X Window System alternatives to GNOME and Qt-KDE applications. The LXDE desktop only includes English and Spanish localizations, and can install from a 1.2 GB live DVD image.

Triskel 
Triskel is another alternative to mainline Trisquel using the KDE graphical interface, available as a 2.0 GB ISO DVD live image.

Trisquel Sugar TOAST 
Sugar is a free and open source desktop environment designed with the goal of being used by children for interactive learning. Sugar replaces the standard MATE desktop environment available with Trisquel.

Trisquel NetInstall 
NetInstall consists of a 25MB CD iso image with just the minimal amount of software to start the installation via a text based network installer and fetch the remaining packages over the Internet.

Internationalization 
The full installation includes 51 languages (Albanian, Arabic, Aranese, Asturian, Basque, Bulgarian, Catalan, Central Khmer, Simplified Chinese, Traditional Chinese, Croatian, Czech, Danish, Dutch, English, Esperanto, Estonian, Finnish, French, Galician, German, Greek, Hebrew, Hindi, Hungarian, Indonesian, Irish, Italian, Japanese, Korean, Latvian, Lithuanian, Low German, Norwegian Bokmål, Norwegian Nynorsk, Occitan, Punjabi, Polish, Portuguese, Romanian, Russian, Serbian, Slovak, Slovenian, Spanish, Swedish, Tamil, Thai, Turkish, Valencian and Vietnamese) pre-installed in a downloadable 1.2-gigabyte DVD image.

Source code for the full Trisquel installation is also available in a downloadable 3-gigabyte DVD image.

History 
The project began in 2004 with sponsorship of the University of Vigo for Galician language support in education software and was officially presented in April 2005 with Richard Stallman, founder of the GNU Project, as a special guest. According to project director Rubén Rodríguez, the support for Galician has created interest in South American and Mexican communities of emigrants from the Province of Ourense.

By December 2008, Trisquel was included by the Free Software Foundation (FSF) in its list of Linux distributions endorsed by the Free Software Foundation.

Release history 

The releases that use GNOME 3.x use GNOME Classic/Flashback, rather than the default GNOME Shell. All Trisquel releases starting with version 6 are only based on Ubuntu LTS releases.

Current versions include this common software:
 Abrowser, a rebranded version of Firefox that never suggests non-free add-ons, and includes no trademarked art or names. It features privacy enhancing modifications such as not starting network connections on its own. It is rebranded because the Mozilla Trademark Policy forbids modifications that include their trademark without consent.

Prior editions:
 Gnash, a SWF viewer, instead of Adobe Flash Player, which is proprietary software.

 Trisquel Pro was business-oriented and small. It was part of the Trisquel 2.0 LTS Robur (2008), but no other release followed.
 Trisquel Edu was education-oriented, for schools and universities. Like Trisquel Pro, no other release followed Trisquel 2.0 Robur (2008).
 Trisquel on Sugar was education-oriented, based on the Sugar desktop environment for interactive learning for children. It was released at the same time as Trisquel 7.
 Trisquel Gamer was an independent edition maintained by David Zaragoza. It included 55 free software games and could boot from a live DVD or USB drive. It was released with Trisquel 3.5 (2010), which is no longer supported.

Reception 

Jesse Smith of DistroWatch reviewed the 4.0 release, Taranis, and described it as refined and dependable. He portrayed difficulty with removing software as his main problem with the release. He complimented it as an operating system that showcased utility instead of mere compliance with free software criteria.

Jesse Smith also reviewed Trisquel 7.0 in 2014, writing "Whenever I boot up Trisquel I find myself wondering whether the free software only distribution will be able to hold its own when it comes to hardware drivers, multimedia support and productivity software. The answer I came to when running Trisquel 7.0 is that, yes, the distribution appears to be nearly as capable as operating systems that do not stick to the FSF's definition of free software. Some people who use hardware that requires binary blobs or non-free drivers may face problems and Flash support isn't perfect when using the free Gnash player, but otherwise Trisquel appears to be every bit as functional as other mainstream Linux distributions. The software Trisquel ships with appears to be stable, functional and user friendly. The distribution is easy to install, I found it pleasant to use and I didn't encounter any problems. People who value or wish to promote free software should definitely try running Trisquel, it's an excellent example of what can be accomplished with free software."

Jim Lynch of Desktop Linux Reviews reviewed the 5.5 release, Brigantia, and described it as "well-ordered and well developed" and recommended it to users whether they care about only using free software or not. Lynch stated that the release was suitable for beginners and advanced users.

Chris Fisher and Matt Hartley of The Linux Action Show! praised the design, ease of use, and hardware support of Trisquel 5.5 and Trisquel 5.5 Mini, but found that the Linux-libre kernel found in Trisquel impedes functionality of proprietary wireless devices. They argued that the distribution was targeting power users and that new users should use a different distribution.

Richard Stallman announced in January 2015 that he is using Trisquel on a Thinkpad X60 instead of his former computer the Lemote Yeeloong.

Hardware 
IA-32 and x86-64 CPU architectures were supported since Trisquel 5.5, which includes free software compatible chipsets. However, 32-bit support was dropped with the release of Trisquel 10.

See also 

Comparison of Linux distributions
List of Linux distributions based on Ubuntu

References

External links 

 
 

2007 software
Free software only Linux distributions
Linux distributions
Spanish-language Linux distributions
Ubuntu derivatives